The Real Housewives of Dubai (abbreviated RHODubai) is an American reality television series which has been broadcast on Bravo since June 1, 2022. Developed as the eleventh installment of The Real Housewives franchise, it has aired one season and focuses on the personal and professional lives of several women living in or around Dubai, United Arab Emirates.

Overview and casting 

The first season aired from June 1 to September 7, 2022. The original cast consisted of Nina Ali, Chanel Ayan, Caroline Brooks, Sara Al Madani, Lesa Milan and Caroline Stanbury. Phaedra Parks of The Real Housewives of Atlanta appears in a recurring guest role. Lystra Adams of The Real Housewives of Cheshire made a guest appearance during the season finale. Ali announced her departure from the series in January 2023.

Timeline of cast members

Episodes

References

Dubai
2020s American reality television series
2022 American television series debuts
Bravo (American TV network) original programming
Television series by Endemol
Women in the United Arab Emirates